The 1956 Gainsborough by-election was held on 14 February 1956. It was held due to the elevation of the incumbent Conservative MP, Harry Crookshank to a hereditary peerage. It was won by the Conservative candidate Marcus Kimball. The Liberals polled over 20% of the vote, having not fielded a candidate in 1955. After the by-election Kimball was Baby of the House.

References

Gainsborough by-election
Gainsborough by-election
Gainsborough by-election
By-elections to the Parliament of the United Kingdom in Lincolnshire constituencies